Zahir Pir is a city in the Rahim Yar Khan District of Punjab, Pakistan. It is located on N-5.It has Motorway Exchange from M-5 also. Zahir Pir is connected with Rahim Yar Khan District HQ (65 km) Khanpur Tehsil HQ (25 km), Chachran Sharif on Indus River Bank (11 km) and connected to Kot Mitthan (25 km) via Bridge.

References

Populated places in Rahim Yar Khan District
Rahim Yar Khan District